Shadowlife is the sixth studio album by the American heavy metal band Dokken, released in 1997. It marks a change in the band's musical style, moving towards alternative rock. However, critics and fans alike were not pleased with the change, and dismiss the album as one of Dokken's weakest. It is also the last studio album with original lead guitarist George Lynch.

Track listing

Tracks 14 and 15 are bonus tracks on the Japanese release (VICP-5839).

Personnel

Dokken
Don Dokken - vocals
George Lynch - lead and rhythm guitars
Jeff Pilson - bass guitar, lead vocals on "Here I Stand"
Mick Brown - drums

Production
Kelly Gray - producer, engineer, mixing
Aaron Carey - mixing assistant
Eddy Schreyer, Gene Grimaldi - mastering

Charts

References

Dokken albums
1997 albums
Albums produced by Kelly Gray
CMC International albums
JVC Records albums